The 1945–46 season was the final season in which Dundee competed under wartime conditions, with the season beginning in the final days of World War II, which would end on 2 September 1945. Dundee were placed in the Southern Football League's B Division, and despite dominating the league and winning comfortably, they were not promoted to the top tier for the following season's resumption of the Scottish Football League. Dundee would also compete in several cups in lieu of the Scottish Cup's suspension. They would play in the Southern League Cup, the precursor to the Scottish League Cup, making it to the Quarter-finals; the B Division Supplementary Cup where they would get to the Semi-finals, and in the one-off Victory Cup where they would be knocked out in the 1st round.

For this season only, Dundee would return to wearing a white shirt and black shorts as the club's primary colours until February for the first time since the 1901–02 season, before returning to a navy jersey and wearing red socks for the first time. The likely reason for the return to white shirts was probably due to clothes rations implemented due to World War II.

Southern Football League 

Statistics provided by Dee Archive.

B Division

League table

B Division Supplementary Cup 

Statistics provided by Dee Archive.

Southern League Cup 

Statistics provided by Dee Archive.

Group Section 6

Section 6 final table

Knockout stage

Victory Cup 

Statistics provided by Dee Archive.

Player Statistics 
Statistics provided by Dee Archive

|}

See also 

 List of Dundee F.C. seasons

References

External links 

 1945-46 Dundee season on Fitbastats

Dundee F.C. seasons
Dundee